Russelva is a  long river in Troms og Finnmark county, Norway.  The river lies almost entirely in the Kvalsund area of Hammerfest Municipality, but the first  or so of the river lies in Porsanger Municipality.  The river begins near the Tverrusselv Bridge at the confluence of two rivers:  Tverrusselv and Miessejohka.  The river then flows to the north-northwest before empyting into the Revsbotn fjord at the village of Kokelv.

See also
List of rivers in Norway

References

Rivers of Troms og Finnmark
Kvalsund
Hammerfest